Sujata, also Sujātā, was a farmer's wife, who is said to have fed Gautama Buddha a bowl of kheera, a milk-rice pudding, ending his six years of asceticism. Such was his emaciated appearance that she wrongly believed him to be a tree-spirit that had granted her wish of having a child. The gift provided him enough strength to cultivate the Middle Way, develop jhana, and attain Bodhi, thereafter becoming known as the Buddha.

The village of Bakraur near Bodh Gaya is believed to be her home. The Sujata Stupa was dedicated to her there in the 2nd century BCE.

Gallery

References

Buddhism and women
Foremost disciples of Gautama Buddha